Codex Tischendorfianus V or Lectionary 293 (Gregory-Aland), designated by siglum ℓ 293 (in the Gregory-Aland numbering) is a Greek manuscript of the New Testament, on parchment. Palaeographically it has been assigned to the 8th century.
Scrivener labelled it as 190e.

Description 

The codex contains lessons from the Gospel of John, Matthew, and Luke (Evangelistarium), on 89 parchment leaves, with some lacunae. It is a palimpsest, the upper and younger text contains lessons from the Book of Psalms. It is dated to the 12th century.

The text is written in Greek uncial letters, in two columns per page, 20 lines per page. The manuscript contains weekday Gospel lessons. It contains music notes.

History 

Scrivener and Gregory dated it to the 8th or 9th century. It has been assigned by the Institute for New Testament Textual Research to the 8th century.

The manuscript was examined by Constantin von Tischendorf in 1843, who gave some extracts from the codex in his Anecdota.

The manuscript was added to the list of New Testament manuscripts by Scrivener (number 190e) and Gregory (number 293e). Gregory saw the manuscript in 1884.

The manuscript is not cited in the critical editions of the Greek New Testament (UBS3).

The codex is housed at the University of Leipzig (Cod. Gr. 3), in Leipzig.

See also 

 List of New Testament lectionaries
 Biblical manuscript
 Textual criticism
 Lectionary 292

Notes and references

Bibliography 

 C. v. Tischendorf, Anecdota sacra et profana ex Oriente et Occidente allata (1861), pp. XII, 29–34.
 

Greek New Testament lectionaries
8th-century biblical manuscripts
Palimpsests
12th-century biblical manuscripts